Takapoto, Tua-poto or Oura, is an atoll in the Tuamotu group in French Polynesia.

Takapoto's lagoon has a high salinity and a strong phytoplankton biomass.

Geographically Takapoto is part of the King George Islands (Iles du Roi Georges) subgroup, which includes: Ahe, Manihi, Takapoto, Takaroa and Tikei.

Takapoto Atoll has 380 inhabitants. Fakatopatere, the main village on Takapoto, is located at the southern end of the atoll.

History
The first recorded European to sight Takapoto Atoll was Jacob Le Maire in 1616.

Takapoto Atoll was visited by the Charles Wilkes expedition in September 1839.

Takapoto Airport was inaugurated in 1973.

Administration
The commune of Takaroa-Takapoto consists of the atolls of Takaroa and Takapoto, and Tikei Island.

See also
Takapoto Airport

References

Takapoto Airport
Fakatopatere village
Names
Wilkes Expedition

External links
Atoll list (in French)
Classification of the French Polynesian atolls by Salvat (1985)

Atolls of the Tuamotus